Norman Baillie-Stewart  (15 January 1909 – 7 June 1966) was a British army officer known as The Officer in the Tower when he was imprisoned in the Tower of London. An active sympathiser of Nazi Germany, he took part in German-produced propaganda broadcasts and is known as one of the men associated with the nickname Lord Haw-Haw.

Early life
Baillie-Stewart's father was Lieutenant Colonel Cron Hope Baillie Wright, an officer in the British Indian Army who served in the 62nd Punjabis during the First World War. His mother was from a family with a long tradition of military service.

Baillie-Stewart attended Bedford School and the Royal Military College, Sandhurst, where as a cadet, he served as an orderly to Prince Henry, a younger son of King George V.

In January 1929, still a cadet, he changed his surname from Wright to Baillie-Stewart, perhaps under the belief that he was looked down upon by more senior officers. He graduated tenth in the order of merit and in February 1929 received a commission as a subaltern in the Seaforth Highlanders although he soon grew to dislike army life.

In 1929, Baillie-Stewart was posted to the Seaforth's Second Battalion in India.  In 1930, he saw active service on the North West Frontier, where he was reprimanded by his company commander for removing a native banner from an Afridi tribal graveyard, which aggravated tensions with local tribesmen. He later replaced the banner on the orders of a senior officer. A campaign medal was authorised for that campaign, but Baillie-Stewart did not receive it. The roll of recipients compiled in September 1933, after his conviction, noted against his name, "No medal, forfeited. Cashiered".

He returned to England in early 1931 after he had applied for transfer to the Royal Army Service Corps.

1933 court martial

In the spring of 1933, Baillie-Stewart was court-martialled at Chelsea Barracks under the Official Secrets Act for selling military secrets to a foreign power. Because Britain was not at war, Baillie-Stewart was not in danger of the death penalty, but the ten charges against him carried a maximum sentence of 140 years in jail. He pleaded not guilty to all charges.

The court was told that Baillie-Stewart began to offend in 1931 when he met and fell in love with a German woman while he was holidaying in Germany. He decided to become a German citizen and wrote a letter to the German Consul in London to offer his services. Receiving no answer, he travelled to Berlin without permission to take leave, where he telephoned the German Foreign Ministry and demanded to talk to an English-speaker. That resulted in him making contact with a Major Mueller under the Brandenburg Gate, where he agreed to spy for Germany.

Using the pretext of studying for Staff College examinations, he borrowed from the Aldershot Military Library specifications and photographs of an experimental tank, the Vickers A1E1 Independent, as well as a new automatic rifle and notes on the organisation of tank and armoured car units. It was charged that he had sold this material to a German known as "Otto Waldemar Obst" in return for which he received two letters signed "Marie-Luise", one containing ten £5 notes and the other four £10 notes. Evidence was also produced that he had also made several trips to the Netherlands to meet his handlers. MI5 files have since shown that Marie-Luise had been merely a figment of his controller's imagination. Major Mueller's covername was Obst (fruit) and Baillie-Stewart's was Poiret (little pear), and Marie-Luise, a type of pear, was used to conceal their correspondence.
Ballie was convicted of seven of the ten charges against him and was imprisoned for five years. He was released from Maidstone Prison on 20 January 1937. He was initially held at the Tower of London and was the last British subject to be held there as a proper prisoner, rather than as one awaiting transfer.

German collaboration
After his release from prison in 1937, Baillie-Stewart moved to Vienna, where he applied for Austrian citizenship. However, it was refused since he did not meet the residency qualification. In August 1937, the Austrian government, led by Kurt Schuschnigg, suspected him of being a Nazi agent and gave him three weeks to leave Austria. Baillie-Stewart's disenchantment with Britain was increased when the British embassy in Vienna refused to help him. Rather than return to Britain he went to Bratislava, which was then in Czechoslovakia.

Following the Anschluss, Baillie-Stewart was able to return to Austria, where he made a modest living by operating a trading company. He applied for naturalisation, but the application was delayed by bureaucracy at the ministry, and he did not become a German citizen until 1940.

In July 1939, Baillie-Stewart attended a friend's party in which he happened to hear some German English-language propaganda broadcasts. He criticised the broadcasts and was overheard by a guest at the party who happened to work at the Austrian radio station. He informed his superiors of Baillie-Stewart's comments, and after a successful voice test in Berlin, Baillie-Stewart was ordered by the German Propaganda Ministry to report to the Reich Broadcasting Corporation (Reichsrundfunk) in Berlin, where he became a propaganda broadcaster in August 1939, taking over as chief broadcaster from Wolf Mittler. Baillie-Stewart made his first broadcast reading pro-Nazi news on the Germany Calling English-language service a week before the United Kingdom declared war on Germany.

It has been speculated that it was Baillie-Stewart who made the broadcast that led the pseudonymous Daily Express radio critic Jonah Barrington to coin the term "Haw-Haw". The nickname possibly referenced Baillie-Stewart's exaggeratedly aristocratic way of speaking, but Wolf Mittler is usually considered a more likely candidate. When William Joyce later became the most prominent Nazi propaganda broadcaster, Barrington appended the title and named Joyce "Lord Haw-Haw" since the true identity of the broadcaster was then unknown. Another nickname possibly applied to Baillie-Stewart was "Sinister Sam".

By the end of September 1939, it had been clear to the radio authorities that Joyce, originally Baillie-Stewart's backup man, was more effective. Baillie-Stewart, who had gradually become disenchanted with the material that he had to broadcast, was dismissed in December 1939, shortly after his last radio broadcast. He continued to work in Berlin as a translator for the German Foreign Ministry and lectured in English at Berlin University. In early 1940, he acquired German citizenship.

In early 1942, Baillie-Stewart made a brief return to radio under the alias of "Lancer". He made several broadcasts for both the Reichsrundfunk and Radio Luxembourg. He spent much time avoiding the more blatant propaganda material he was asked to present.
He translated to English the words of "Lili Marleen", which were sung by Lale Andersen as a form of propaganda towards Allied soldiers but then taken up strongly by the Allies themselves.

In 1944, Baillie-Stewart had himself sent to Vienna for medical treatment, where he was arrested in 1945 in Altaussee, while he was wearing "chamois leather shorts, embroidered braces and a forester's jacket", and was sent to Britain to face charges of high treason.

Postwar
Baillie-Stewart avoided execution only because the Attorney-General, Hartley Shawcross, did not think he could successfully try him on charges of high treason since he had German citizenship and instead decided to try him on the lesser charge of "committing an act likely to assist the enemy". The Security Service (MI5) reportedly lobbied for him to be sent to the Soviet occupation zone of Germany, where there would be no "namby-pamby legal hair-splitting". The depositions from his trial are available in the British National Archives under reference CRIM 1/1750.

Baillie-Stewart pleaded guilty to the charge and was sentenced to five years' imprisonment, and he then moved to Ireland under the pseudonym of James Scott, married, and settled in the Dublin suburb of Raheny. He had two children before he died of a heart attack after collapsing at a pub in Harmonstown in June 1966. At the time of his death, he had just completed his autobiography, which he had co-written with John Murdock and was published in 1967.<ref>{{Cite book|author= Baillie-Stewart, Norman and Murdoch, John.|title=The Officer in the Tower. Published Leslie Frewin, London. 1967}}</ref>

Notes

Bibliography
 Baillie-Stewart, Norman and Murdoch, John. The Officer in the Tower'', London: Leslie Frewin, 1967. 
 Murphy, Sean. Letting the Side Down: British Traitors of the Second World War, PP 50–60, 217–218. London: The History Press Ltd, 2005. 
 
 "Baillie-Stewart Trial." Times, London, England, 10 Jan. 1946: 2. The Times Digital Archive. Web. 20 Mar. 2015.
 "Baillie-Stewart Sentenced." Times, London, England, 11 Jan. 1946: 2. The Times Digital Archive. Web. 13 Apr. 2017.

References

1909 births
1966 deaths
Military personnel from London
British fascists
German spies
Nazi propagandists
Graduates of the Royal Military College, Sandhurst
Seaforth Highlanders officers
People educated at Bedford School
English people of Scottish descent
Naturalized citizens of Germany
German emigrants to Ireland
People convicted of spying
Interwar-period spies
English autobiographers
Prisoners and detainees of the British military
British prisoners and detainees
English broadcasters for Nazi Germany